Jane Morris (née Burden; 19 October 1839 – 26 January 1914) was an English embroiderer in the Arts and Crafts movement and artists' model who embodied the Pre-Raphaelite ideal of beauty. She was a model and muse to her husband William Morris and to Dante Gabriel Rossetti. Her sister was embroiderer and teacher Elizabeth Burden.

Life
Jane Burden was born in Oxford, the daughter of a stableman, Robert Burden, and his wife Ann Maizey, who was a domestic servant or a laundress. At the time of her birth, her parents were living at St Helen's Passage, in the parish of St Peter-in-the-East, off Holywell Street in Oxford which has since been marked with a blue plaque. Her mother Ann was illiterate and probably came to Oxford as a domestic servant. Little is known of Jane Burden's childhood, but it was certainly poor.

In October 1857, Burden and her sister Elizabeth, known as Bessie, attended a performance of the Drury Lane Theatre Company in Oxford. Jane Burden was noticed by Dante Gabriel Rossetti and Edward Burne-Jones who were members of a group of artists painting the Oxford Union murals, based on Arthurian tales. Struck by her beauty, they asked her to model for them. Burden sat mostly for Rossetti as a model for Queen Guinevere and afterwards for William Morris, who was working on an easel painting, La Belle Iseult, now in the Tate Gallery. During this period, Morris fell in love with Burden and they became engaged, though by her own admission she was not in love with Morris.

Burden's education was limited, and she probably was destined to go into domestic service like her mother. After her engagement, she was privately educated to become a gentleman's wife. Her keen intelligence allowed her to recreate herself. She was a voracious reader who became proficient in French and Italian, and she became an accomplished pianist with a strong background in classical music. Her manners and speech became refined to an extent that contemporaries referred to her as "queenly." Later in life, she had no trouble moving in upper-class circles. She was the model for the heroine of the 1884 novel Miss Brown by Vernon Lee and may also have influenced George Bernard Shaw in creating the character of Eliza Doolittle in his play Pygmalion (1914) and the later film My Fair Lady (1964). She also became a skilled needlewoman, self-taught in ancient embroidery techniques, and later became renowned for her own embroideries.

Jane married William Morris at St Michael at the Northgate in Oxford on 26 April 1859. After the marriage, the Morrises moved to the quasi-medieval Red House in Bexleyheath, Kent. While living there, they had two daughters, Jane Alice "Jenny," born 17 January 1861, and Mary "May" born 25 March 1862, who later edited her father's works. They moved to 26 Queen Square in London, which they shared with the design firm of Morris, Marshall, Faulkner & Co., and later bought Kelmscott House in Hammersmith as their main residence. Although Jane, her daughters Jenny and May, and her sister Bessie all supervised and embroidered for Morris & Co., credit for the designs were given to William Morris himself "in the interests of commercial success." The three embroidered panels depicting the illustrious women of Chaucer and Tennyson's writing now at Castle Howard were produced by Jane and Bessie in the 1880s.

In 1871, William Morris and Rossetti took out a joint tenancy on Kelmscott Manor on the Gloucestershire–Oxfordshire–Wiltshire borders. William Morris went to Iceland, leaving his wife and Rossetti to furnish the house and spend the summer there. Jane Morris had become closely attached to Rossetti and became a favorite muse of his. Their romantic relationship is reputed to have started in the late 1860s and lasted, on differing levels, until his death in 1882. They shared a deep emotional connection, and she inspired Rossetti to write poetry and create some of his best paintings. Her discovery of his dependence on chloral hydrate, which was taken for insomnia, eventually led her to distance herself from him, although they stayed in touch until he died in 1882.

In 1883, Jane Morris met the poet and political activist Wilfrid Scawen Blunt at a house party given by her close friend, Rosalind Howard (later Countess of Carlisle). There appears to have been an immediate attraction between them. By 1887 at the latest, they had become lovers. Their sexual relationship continued until 1894 and they remained close friends until her death.

Despite her husband's socialism, Jane remained a supporter of the Liberal Party until her death.  She was also was an ardent supporter of Irish Home Rule.

A few months before her death, she bought Kelmscott Manor to secure it for her daughters' future. However, she did not return to the house after having purchased it. Jane Morris died on 26 January 1914, while staying at 5 Brock Street in Bath. She is buried in the churchyard of St. George's Church in Kelmscott.

Gallery

Paintings and artworks

Jane Morris's embroidery:

 Bag, embroidered silk. c.1878, Colored silks, metal mount. Victoria & Albert Museum, London.
 The Legend of Good Women embroidered panels, 1880s, by Jane Morris and Elizabeth Burden, Castle Howard.
 Honeysuckle embroidery, designed in 1876, made 1880s, silk and linen, William Morris Gallery, London.

Paintings of Jane Morris by Dante Gabriel Rossetti:

 The Blue Silk Dress, 1868.
 Proserpine or Proserpina, 1874. Oil on canvas. Tate Britain gallery, London.
 Astarte Syriaca, 1875–1879. City Art Gallery, Manchester.
 Beatrice, a Portrait of Jane Morris, 1879. Oil on canvas  × 11 inches.
 The Day Dream, 1880. Oil on canvas. Victoria and Albert Museum, London.
 La Donna della Fiamma, 1877. Coloured chalks. Manchester Art Gallery.
 La Donna della Finestra, 1879. Oil on canvas. Fogg Museum of Art, Harvard University, Cambridge, USA.
 La Donna Della Finestra, 1881 (unfinished).
 Jane Morris, c. 1860. Pencil.
 Jane Morris, 1865.
 Mariana, 1870. Aberdeen Art Gallery.
 Pandora, 1869.
 Pandora, 1871.
 La Pia de' Tolomei, 1866–1870. Oil on canvas. Spencer Museum of Art, University of Kansas.
 Portrait of Mrs William Morris.
 Portrait of Jane Morris, 1858. Pen.
 Reverie, 1868. Chalk on paper. Ashmolean Museum, Oxford, UK.
 The Roseleaf, 1865. Pencil.
 Study of Guinevere for Sir Lancelot in the Queen's Chamber, 1857.
 Water Willow, 1871. Delaware Art Museum

By William Morris:
 La Belle Iseult (also called Queen Guinevere), 1858. Oil.

By Edward Burne-Jones:
 Numerous stained-glass windows, including at Christ Church, Oxford.

By Evelyn De Morgan:
 The Love Potion 1903
 Chalk study of Jane Morris for The Hourglass, 1904. De Morgan Foundation
 The Hourglass 1905 De Morgan Foundation Wightwick Manor

Notes

Further reading

Sharp, Frank C and Marsh, Jan, (2012) The Collected Letters of Jane Morris, Boydell & Brewer, London
Sharp, Frank C.,  ‘Morris [Burden], Jane (1839–1914)’, Oxford Dictionary of National Biography, Oxford University Press, 2004
Parkins, Wendy (2013). Jane Morris: The Burden of History. Edinburgh: Edinburgh University Press. Retrieved 9 March 2020, from www.jstor.org/stable/10.3366/j.ctt3fgtfq.

1839 births
1914 deaths
British stained glass artists and manufacturers
English artists' models
History of glass
Artists from Oxford
Pre-Raphaelite Brotherhood artists' models
Women of the Victorian era
Muses
British embroiderers